The 2022 season was Northern Diamonds' third season, in which they competed in the 50 over Rachael Heyhoe Flint Trophy and the Twenty20 Charlotte Edwards Cup. In the Charlotte Edwards Cup, the side finished second in Group B, winning three of their six matches. The side finished top of the group in the Rachael Heyhoe Flint Trophy, winning six of their seven matches (with the other cancelled) and progressing directly to the final. In the final, they faced Southern Vipers for the third time in three Rachael Heyhoe Flint Trophy finals. Northern Diamonds won by 2 runs to claim their first ever title. Northern Diamonds batter Lauren Winfield-Hill was named as Player of the Year in the Rachael Heyhoe Flint Trophy, and was the tournament's leading run-scorer with 470 runs at an average of 78.30.
 
The side was captained by Hollie Armitage and coached by Danielle Hazell. They played three home matches at the Riverside Ground and three at Headingley Cricket Ground.

Squad

Changes
On 29 October 2021, it was announced that Ami Campbell and Phoebe Graham had both left the side, signing professional contracts with Central Sparks and North West Thunder, respectively. On the same day it was announced that Bess Heath, Katie Levick, Sterre Kalis and Rachel Slater had all signed professional contracts with the side, having previously been on temporary contracts. On 29 April 2022, it was announced that the side had signed Leigh Kasperek as an overseas player and Yvonne Graves from Lightning, as well as promoting Emma Marlow and Phoebe Turner to the senior squad from the Academy. It was also announced that Katherine Fraser and Mariko Hill would be training with the squad during the season. The side's full 18-player squad was confirmed on 12 May 2022, with the addition of Abigail Glen and the departure of Alex MacDonald, Helen Fenby and Ella Telford. Mariko Hill was added to the full squad on 28 May 2022. Lizzie Scott was added to the squad in September 2022, making her debut for the side on 11 September. Jessica Woolston and Grace Hall were first included in a matchday squad on 16 September 2022.

Squad list
 Age given is at the start of Northern Diamonds' first match of the season (14 May 2022).

Charlotte Edwards Cup

Group B

 advanced to the final

Fixtures

Tournament statistics

Batting

Source: ESPN Cricinfo Qualification: 50 runs.

Bowling

Source: ESPN Cricinfo Qualification: 5 wickets.

Rachael Heyhoe Flint Trophy

Season standings

 advanced to final
 advanced to the play-off

Fixtures

Final

Tournament statistics

Batting

Source: ESPN Cricinfo Qualification: 100 runs.

Bowling

Source: ESPN Cricinfo Qualification: 5 wickets.

Season statistics

Batting

Bowling

Fielding

Wicket-keeping

References

Northern Diamonds seasons
2022 in English women's cricket